Sher Bahadur Subedi is a Sikkim Democratic Front politician from Sikkim. He was elected in Sikkim Legislative Assembly election in 2014 from Gyalshing-Barnyak constituency as candidate of Sikkim Democratic Front. He was minister of Rural Management & Development, Panchayati Raj and Cooperation in Pawan Chamling fifth ministry from 2014 to 2019.

References 

Living people
Sikkim MLAs 2014–2019
Sikkim Democratic Front politicians
Year of birth missing (living people)
People from Gyalshing district